In molecular biology, FTX transcript, XIST regulator (non-protein coding), also known as FTX (Five prime to Xist), is a long non-coding RNA. In humans, it is located on the X chromosome. It was identified during sequence analysis of the X inactivation centre, surrounding the XIST gene. FTX contains several microRNAs within its introns. It upregulates expression of XIST, and inhibits DNA methylation of the XIST promoter.

See also
 Long noncoding RNA

References

Non-coding RNA